The Good War: Why We Couldn’t Win the War or the Peace in Afghanistan is a 2014 book by British writer Jack Fairweather, a former Washington Post war correspondent, about the recent War in Afghanistan.

References 

2014 non-fiction books
War in Afghanistan (2001–2021) books
Basic Books books